Seasons of Fear is a Big Finish Productions audio drama based on the long-running British science fiction television series Doctor Who.

Plot
When the Doctor finally manages to bring Charley to Singapore in 1930, they meet the immortal being Sebastian Grayle whose secret power they must discover in order to defeat him. Travelling across Earth in four different periods of its history, the Doctor comes face to face with an old enemy...

Cast
The Doctor — Paul McGann
Charley Pollard — India Fisher
Grayle — Stephen Perring
Marcus — Robert Curbishley
Lucilius — Stephen Fewell
Edward — Lennox Greaves
Edith — Sue Wallace
Lucy Martin — Justine Mitchell
Richard Martin — Stephen Fewell
Grayle's Masters' Voices — Robert Curbishley
The Auditor — Don Warrington

External links
Big Finish Productions - Seasons of Fear

2002 audio plays
Eighth Doctor audio plays
Fiction set in Roman Britain
Works by Paul Cornell
Fiction set in the 4th century
Fiction set in the 11th century
Fiction set in 1806
Fiction set in 1930